The Juno Award for Rap Album or EP of the Year is an annual Canadian music award, presented by the Juno Awards to honour full-length releases by Canadian hip hop artists. Announced at the Juno Awards of 2021, it was presented for the first time at the Juno Awards of 2022.

The award is presented alongside a new category for Rap Single of the Year.

Until 2022, albums and individual songs were considered together under the single Rap Recording of the Year category. The changes were announced to coincide with the 30th anniversary of the creation of the Junos rap category.

Winners and nominees

References

Rap Album
Canadian hip hop